Dieter Kindlmann and Martin Slanar were the defending champions, Kindlmann chose not to participate. Slanar partnered Aisam-ul-Haq Qureshi and successfully defended his title defeating Tatsuma Ito and Takao Suzuki in the final, 6–7(7–9), 7–6(7–3), [10–6].

Seeds

Draw

References
 Main Draw

All Japan Indoor Tennis Championships